Soran may refer to:

Places
Soran Emirate, a Kurdish principality
Soran District, a region within the Kurdish Autonomous Region in northern Iraq
Soran, Iraq, a seat of the district government
Sawran, Syria, a town in Syria near Aleppo

Fictional characters
Setsuna F Seiei (Soran Ibrahim), protagonist of the Japanese anime series Mobile Suit Gundam 00
Tolian Soran, character in the film Star Trek Generations

Other
 Soran (band), a South Korean rock band
 Sōran Bushi, a traditional song and dance in Japan
 Soran clan, a Kurdish clan
 Soran Ebrahim, Kurdish actor in the film Turtles Can Fly